Exam Warriors is a book by Prime Minister of India Narendra Modi, published in 2018. Exam Warriors is written for young students to help them deal with the stress of exams.
It is available in 13 languages as follows, Hindi, English, Tamil, Telugu, Malayalam, Kannada, Odia, Assamese, Gujarati, Marathi, Punjabi, Urdu & Bengali.

Translations

Exam warriors was translated in Tamil as Paridsaikub Payaman by V. Insuvai and released by Alliance Publishing on September 05, 2018.

Exam warriors is translated into Kannada by Sahitya Panchanan P. K. Narayana Pillai, Hubballi, and is distributed to all government schools in India. It is also published in a Braille version which was launched by Narendra Modi on World Braille Day.

References 

Self-help books
2018 non-fiction books
English-language books
Penguin Books books